Stibaromacha is a moth genus in the family Autostichidae.

Species
 Stibaromacha ratella (Herrich-Schäffer, 1854)
 Stibaromacha ratellina (Turati, 1919)

References

 
Symmocinae